Mattiline Render (born February 17, 1947) is an American sprinter. In 1971 she won a gold medal in the 4 × 100 m relay at the Pan American Games and set a world record in the 4×110 yard relay. The year after, she competed in the 100 m and 4 × 100 m events at the 1972 Summer Olympics and placed fourth in the relay. During her career Render ran for Tennessee State University, Temple University and New York Police Athletic League.

References

1947 births
Living people
Athletes (track and field) at the 1972 Summer Olympics
Athletes (track and field) at the 1971 Pan American Games
American female sprinters
Olympic track and field athletes of the United States
Pan American Games gold medalists for the United States
Pan American Games medalists in athletics (track and field)
People from Coweta County, Georgia
Sportspeople from the Atlanta metropolitan area
Track and field athletes from Georgia (U.S. state)
Tennessee State Lady Tigers track and field athletes
Medalists at the 1971 Pan American Games